Yosneidy Evangelista “Lala” Zambrano Mujica (born 16 May 1997) is a Venezuelan footballer who plays as a forward for Ecuadorian club Ñañas. She has been a member of the Venezuela women's national team.

International career
Zambrano represented Venezuela at the 2013 South American U-17 Women's Championship, the 2014 FIFA U-17 Women's World Cup, the 2015 South American U-20 Women's Championship and the 2016 FIFA U-20 Women's World Cup. At senior level, she played the 2014 Central American and Caribbean Games.

References

External links
Yosneidy Zambrano's stats at StatsFootFeminin.fr 

1997 births
Living people
Women's association football forwards
Women's association football midfielders
Venezuelan women's footballers
Sportspeople from Maracay
Venezuela women's international footballers
Competitors at the 2014 Central American and Caribbean Games
Asociación Civil Deportivo Lara players
Venezuelan expatriate women's footballers
Venezuelan expatriate sportspeople in France
Expatriate women's footballers in France
Venezuelan expatriate sportspeople in Ecuador
Expatriate women's footballers in Ecuador
Venezuelan expatriate sportspeople in Spain
Expatriate women's footballers in Spain